The Me You Can't See is an American documentary series on mental health streaming on Apple TV+, and hosted by Oprah Winfrey and Prince Harry, Duke of Sussex. The series has five parts and involves notable figures such as performer Lady Gaga, actress Glenn Close and basketball player DeMar DeRozan. The Me You Can't See was released in full on May 21, 2021. A follow-up town hall-style conversation special, titled "A Path Forward", was released on the same platform on May 28, featuring participants and advisers from the main episodes.

Episodes

Production
In April 2019, it was announced that Harry was working as co-creator and executive producer on a documentary series about mental health together with Oprah Winfrey, which was initially set to air in 2020 on Apple TV+. It was later announced that the series would be released on May 21, 2021, under the title The Me You Can't See.

Reception 
On Rotten Tomatoes, the series has an approval rating of 92% based on 12 reviews. On Metacritic, it has a score of 61 out of 100, based on 8 critics, indicating "generally favorable" reviews. The series became the most-watched program worldwide since its May 21 premiere on Apple TV+. 25% new viewers joined the service after the program premiered and average weekend viewership in the UK increased by more than 40%.

In June 2021, Buzzfeed News published an article that described purported "inconsistencies and omissions" in Harry's claims during the documentary when compared to previous interviews.

References

External links
Official website
The Me You Can't See on Apple TV+
 

2020s American documentary television series
2020s American television miniseries
2021 American television series debuts
2021 American television series endings
Apple TV+ original programming
Harpo Productions films
Prince Harry, Duke of Sussex
Oprah Winfrey
Royal scandals